Alastair Riddell is a New Zealand singer-songwriter.

Background
Riddell is a musician and a film maker. He has a singing style that was likened to a combination of Bryan Ferry and David Bowie.<ref>Salient, Vol. 38, No. 4, 1975 Space Waltz featuring Alastair Riddell (EMI)</ref> Prior to 1974, he was in a band called Orb with Eddie Rayner. Then later, the two of them were in Space Waltz.

In 1968, Alastair started a newsletter called "Bluesnews" and also organised the First National Blues Convention, held at Mollers Farm in Oratia, Auckland.

Career
Original Sun
In 1967, Original Sun Blues Band was formed by the original line-up consisting of Alastair on rhythm guitar and vocals, Ron on drums, Peter Kershaw on bass guitar and vocals, and Henry Jackson on lead guitar. The band was influenced by John Mayall & the Bluesbreakers and American blues, with the band's name a nod to Son House. After Peter and Henry left the band, the name was shortened to Original Sun and consisted of Alastair on guitar and vocals, Ron on drums, and Peter Cuddihy on bass guitar. The new line-up took on the more adventurous blues sounds of Jimi Hendrix and Cream. There are no known recordings of the band.

Orb
In 1971, while studying at Auckland University, Alastair formed the Psychedelic Art rock band Orb. They played some of Riddell's original songs, including Seabird which would later feature on the Space Waltz album. Orb consisted of Alastair on rhythm guitar, synthesizer, and vocals, Eddie Rayner on keyboards, Paul Emlyn Crowther on drums, Paul Wilkinson on lead guitar, and Peter Kershaw on bass guitar. They played the Art's Festival in 1972.

Space Waltz
In 1974, Alastair formed the glam rock band Space Waltz. The group appeared on Studio One New Faces and created a stir with their image. They lost out in the finals, however their performance went down well with fans. They were noticed by EMI and promptly signed to the label. Their single "Out on the Street" was a number-one hit in New Zealand.New Zealand Music Commission, Te Reo Reka O Aotearoa Alastair Riddell Releases New Single

The album Space Waltz, which was released by EMI in 1974 featured Riddell, Eddie Rayner, Greg Clark, Peter Cuddihy, Brent Eccles, and The Yandall Sisters.

Post Space Waltz
In 1977, the single "Wonder Ones" / "Oh Ron" was released on the Mandrill label.

In 1978, the self titled album Alastair Riddell was also released on the Mandrill label.

Riddell toured with The Alastair Riddell Band until 1979. The Alastair Riddell Band consisted of Alastair on lead guitar, synthesizer, and vocals, John Treseder on guitar, and Gavin Beardsmore on bass guitar.

He was asked to join Split Enz twice, the first time to replace guitarist Wally Wilkinson, and then again in 1977 when Phil Judd left, with Neil Finn subsequently taking the position. That's What I Call Finn

1980s
In 1983, he contributed electronic drums to the number-one hit "Poi E" by Pātea Māori Club. Incidentally, The Yandall Sisters who sang backup on the Space Waltz album appeared on another track of the album that the hit was on. Both Poi E and Out on the Street appear on the soundtrack for Taika Waititi's 2010 film, Boy.

Later years
In 2012, Riddell directed The Last Stop'', a short film set in 1950s New Zealand which featured his wife Vanessa.  also that year he released a single "Last Of The Golden Weather".

He joined a brief David Bowie tribute tour in 2016 with Jordan Luck, Finn Andrews, Rayner and others, the same year Fraulein Love featured in the trailer for Taika Waititi's 2016 film Hunt for the Wilderpeople.

Personal life
Riddell married English model Vanessa in the 1980s. Riddell and his wife have four children and live in the West Auckland suburb of Titirangi.

Discography (selective)

Film work

References

External links
 

Living people
Year of birth missing (living people)
New Zealand songwriters
New Zealand musicians
Male songwriters
New Zealand film score composers
New Zealand film directors
Male film score composers
People educated at Kelston Boys' High School